Stephanie Bernier (born June 28, 1988) is a Canadian rugby union player.

She represented  at the 2014 Women's Rugby World Cup and was named to the Dream Team. She retired from the national team in 2016 and now coaches Rouge et Or.

Bernier competed in gymnastics before discovering rugby in High School.

References

External links
Rugby Canada Player Profile 

1988 births
Living people
Sportspeople from Quebec City
Canadian female rugby union players
Canada women's international rugby union players
Female rugby union players
Laval Rouge et Or athletes